Anbu Sangili is a 1991 Indian Tamil language drama film directed by B. Nithyaraj. The film stars Anand Babu and Shamili, with Udhayan, newcomer Subisha, Dharani, Uday Prakash, Senthil, Chinni Jayanth and Vivek playing supporting roles. It was released on 30 August 1991.

Plot
Vinoth is a successful stage dancer, he is married and he has a small and clever girl Geethu, the three live happily in their bungalow. One night, Vinoth's car moves down from a slope with Geethu alone in the car. The fugitive Victor, who runs from the police, manages to stop the car and saves Geethu. After that, the police arrest him. Vinoth then meets Victor in jail to help him, and Victor tells his bitter past.

In the past, Victor was a smart student, he lived in an orphanage owned by the kind-hearted church priest Adaikalam. The orphanage struggled to raise funds, so Victor worked part-time as an auto rickshaw driver to help financially the orphanage. One day, Victor found a briefcase full of money in his auto rickshaw forgotten by a passenger. Victor later returned the money to that passenger Devanesan who was a rich industrialist. Impressed by Victor's sincerity, Devanesan promised to give 10 lakhs rupees to the orphanage. In the meantime, Victor and Indhu fell in love with each other. Thereafter, Devanesan died suddenly and his personal assistant Viswanath refused to give the money promised for the orphanage. Victor then came to know that Viswanath actually killed Devanesan for his properties and money. Victor had no other choice than stealing the money from Viswanath's house, but the police started to chase Victor and arrested him when he saved Geethu.

Vinoth decides to help Victor who has to spend three more months in jail. Vinoth gives a small fund for the orphanage, he then threatens Viswanath to give back the money but Viswanath continues to refuse and he decides to kill everyone who stands in his way. Viswanath and his henchmen kill Devanesan's faithful servant Daas, the priest Adaikalam and Vinoth's wife. What transpires next forms the rest of the story.

Cast

Anand Babu as Vinoth
Shamili as Geethu
Udhayan as Victor
Subisha as Indhu
Dharani as Vinoth's wife
Uday Prakash as Viswanath
Senthil as Mathrubootham
Chinni Jayanth as Antony
Vivek as Ku. Rangu
Charuhasan as Adaikalam
Srikanth as Devanesan
K. Kannan as Daas
Sethu Vinayagam as Inspector Prem
Sakthivel as Sakthi
M. Bhanumathi
Linda
Anita
Devi
Jayanthi

Soundtrack

The film score and the soundtrack were composed by Ilayagangai. The soundtrack, released in 1991, features 4 tracks with lyrics written by Vaali, Muthulingam, Sembaiah and L. G. Raniyinmaindhan.

References

1991 films
1990s Tamil-language films
Indian drama films
1991 drama films